Behbud Khan Cherkes, also known as Behbud Beg, was an Iranian gholam of Circassian origin, who served during the reign of Shah Abbas the Great (1588–1629). He held the governorship of Goklan in 1606, Gaskar in 1620, and Astarabad in 1620–1629.

In 1615, Behbud Khan Cherkes killed crown prince Mohammad Baqer Mirza on the orders of Shah Abbas.

Sources
 
  
 

16th-century births
17th-century deaths
Iranian people of Circassian descent
Safavid ghilman
Safavid governors of Astarabad
Safavid governors in Gilan
16th-century people of Safavid Iran
17th-century people of Safavid Iran
Safavid slaves